On 6 October 1995, 15-year-old Nicole van den Hurk disappeared on her way to work in Eindhoven, in the Dutch province of North Brabant. On 22 November, her body was found in the woods between the towns of Mierlo and Lierop.

In 2011, van den Hurk's stepbrother confessed to the killing, but was released a month later due to lack of evidence; he later said he had falsely confessed to get her body exhumed for DNA tests. 

DNA collected from the girl's remains and from the crime scene led to the arrest of a man in January 2014, who is referred to only as Jos de G. in media reports due to a commonly accepted  privacy code from the Dutch media. Jos de G. was already convicted in other cases with the same modus operandi. The serial rapist was charged with rape and manslaughter, however De G. was initially acquitted of manslaughter but found guilty of rape in November 2016, and was sentenced to five years' imprisonment. After the public prosecution appealed against the acquittal, De G. was convicted of both rape and manslaughter and his sentence was increased to twelve years.

Background and disappearance 
Nicole van den Hurk was born on 4 July 1980 in Erkelenz, Germany, to a single mother (Angelika Tegtmeier). After her birth, her mother began a relationship with a Dutchman (Ad van den Hurk); the three later moved to the Netherlands together, where the couple then married. The last name of baby Nicole and her mother, Tegtmeier, were changed into the last name of Nicole’s new stepfather, van den Hurk. In 1989, Van den Hurk's mother and stepfather divorced with the stepfather winning custody of Nicole. Nicole was further raised by her stepfather, and later her new stepmother, along with their other children. One of Nicole’s stepsiblings, Andy, would later help with a breakthrough in the cold case. In April 1995, Nicole’s mother committed suicide in Tilburg. At the time of her disappearance, Van den Hurk was staying at her grandmother's house in Tongelre.

On the early morning of Friday, 6 October 1995, the fifteen-year-old began cycling towards , where she was working a holiday job, failing to arrive. At 18:00 that day, police found her bicycle in the river Dommel. Between then and 17 October, the police searched the river and a nearby forest, and on 19 October, her rucksack was found near Eindhoven's canal; the canal and its south bank were searched the following day. Between 28 and 29 October, these areas were searched again. Her stepfather denied the hypothesis that she had run away to Germany, where her extended family lived. By 20 November, police had received around 300 leads.

On Wednesday, 22 November, a passerby found her body in the woods between Mierlo and Lierop. Her funeral on 28 November was attended by some one thousand mourners. Her post-mortem showed she had suffered two fractures to the jaw, other injuries to the head and fingers, and a rib injury caused by stabbing.

Investigation 
On 24 October 1995, an anonymous man telephoned police saying he could identify the killer, but the call ended prematurely. The recording of the call was broadcast on national television in January 1996 in an attempt to trace the caller. Later, the team of detectives was reduced to four. In February, a friend of the Van den Hurk family arrested for drug trafficking claimed to have been forced to smuggle heroin by men involved in the killing. The police said this testimony was flawed and was of no help. Meanwhile, Passie magazine offered a reward for details about the killer. Between May and June, the victim's stepbrother and stepfather were arrested in connection with the killing, and then cleared.

Confession of the Stepbrother 
In 2004, a cold case team investigated the killing to no avail. By 2011, the victim's stepbrother Andy had moved to England. On 8 March, he confessed to the killing in a Facebook post, and was arrested by British police. He was extradited to the Netherlands on 30 March, but was released five days later as the Facebook post was the only evidence against him. Later, he retracted his confession, saying that he believed his father was the culprit; in a 2016 interview, Andy claimed to have falsely confessed to the killing in order to revive attention to his stepsister's death and get her body exhumed for DNA testing.

At the beginning of 2011, after the confession of her stepbrother, a new cold case team was placed on the case, which continued their research even after the confession turned out to be false. Her remains were exhumed in September 2011 to allow DNA samples to be obtained, while the reward for the killer's details was increased from 25,000 guilders to €15,000; within a week of this, the police announced that foreign DNA had been found on the remains and that they had received more than twenty new leads.

Research 
The prosecution case was based upon test results from physical evidence and investigation of the persons of interest. The total evidence in the case consisted of the following:

 General forensic, forensic pathological and forensic entomological research of the victim’s remains and clothing.
 DNA research of biological samples obtained from the victim’s remains and clothing.
 Forensic identification of the hair found on the victim’s jacket.
 Tactical investigation of all the suspects.
 Background analysis of the victim.

Suspect identification 
The DNA evidence from the  remains consisted of two clear male profiles; one belonged to Van den Hurk's boyfriend (at the time of her murder) and the other to an unknown male. The cold case team made a connection between the modus operandi in Van den Hurk’s case and another rape case in September 2000 in the same area (Valkenswaard). In that case another young woman was taken from her bicycle and raped at knifepoint. The perpetrator of that case was convicted for the crime in 2001. The similarities between the cases gave the detectives enough reasons to compare a previously taken DNA sample from the suspect with the DNA profiles obtained from Nicole’s remains.

On 14 January 2014, the police arrested a 46-year-old man identified as Jos de G. after his DNA matched samples found on the remains and at the crime scene. The semen DNA profile and the mtDNA profile of the hair found on the victim’s jacket both matched with the suspect. De G. had previously been convicted of three rapes, being sentenced to three years preventive detention and compulsory treatment for one of them. He was known to have left his ex-girlfriend's home after a fight hours before the victim's disappearance.

The “Third DNA profile” 
The DNA sample obtained from Van den Hurk’s remains, was the prosecution’s main piece of evidence for De G.’s conviction. However, it was also a controversial piece of evidence, that was used by the defence team against the manslaughter charges from the prosecution during the initial trial.

Collection of DNA samples 
In 1995, these DNA samples were collected from three locations; two on the genital area of the victim’s remains and one on her underwear. The victim’s body was found after being exposed to bacteria and the natural elements for nearly 7 weeks, which resulted in decomposition of DNA material. Furthermore, the collection of DNA in 1995 was done in a more primitive way than would  be done these days. These external factors gave the DNA sample a high risk of contamination.

Analysis by experts 
Several different DNA analysis experts from different forensic institutes were asked to research the complex mixed DNA sample, namely:

 R. Eikelenboom (Independent Forensic Services),
 J. Klaver-Koopman and T.J.P. de Blaeij (Netherlands Forensic Institute), and 
 J.S. Buckleton (Institute of Environmental Science and Research from New Zealand). 

All experts presented their results and conclusion during the trial and were interrogated about their findings. Furthermore, communication with M.W. Perlin, chief scientific officer of Cybergenetics, about his opinion on the matter was used during the trial.

Several computer software programs were used by the experts for the DNA analysis. These programs analyze DNA profiles using statistical methods, a process called probabilistic genotyping. The programs that were used are:

 TrueAllele, a program by Cybergenetics (a genetic software company from the US).
 LRmix Studio and MixCal, programs by Netherlands Forensic Institute.
 STRmix, a program by Institute of Environmental Science and Research created by J.S. Buckleton and colleagues.

Test results 
The three DNA samples were analysed by the experts, but the results were inconclusive as the samples contained complex mixes of DNA profiles. However, the samples contained two clear distinctive DNA profiles from two males—believed by experts to be a match to De G. and Van den Hurk's then-boyfriend. But, apart from the two clear DNA profiles, also some peaks were detected that did not match the two males.

This resulted in the speculation of at least one other suspect, which possibly could be responsible for the killing of the victim instead of De G. It took the DNA experts multiple years to come to a conclusion, and during this time wild speculations were made by the media, the defence team and the prosecution. The explanation from the experts about the inconclusive test results was misinterpreted by many as evidence for a “third DNA profile”. Mainly Nicole’s stepfather and stepbrother were accused of being involved in her murder.

Final trial conclusion 
The DNA results of the complex DNA mix consisted of two distinctive DNA profiles and a set of peaks, which were inconclusive. Relatively quickly, the court came to the conclusion that beyond a reasonable doubt the two distinctive profiles were from Jos de G. and her then-boyfriend. However, the discussion about the set of peaks would take years and they were the reason for the prosecution to appeal the court’s initial verdict. The possible reason for the existence of these peaks were:

 Contamination and DNA degradation (from the DNA collection or before collection by external factors on the remains).
 One or more contributors to the DNA sample, other than the suspect, then-boyfriend or victim.

During the appeal, the Supreme Court concluded that the second possibility was highly unlikely, based on the context and the results from the tactical investigations and forensic research of the case. Therefore, the possibility of at least one more contributor to the DNA sample was eventually rejected by the Supreme Court on 21 April 2020.

Trial

Court hearings 
When the case first came to court in April 2014, De G.'s lawyer disputed the DNA evidence, as DNA from other people, including Van den Hurk's ex-boyfriend, was also found on her remains. His lawyer argued that Van den Hurk may have had consensual sex with De G., as she had multiple sexual partners, and even may have been pregnant when she died. 

In July 2014, the parquet (public prosecution) dropped the murder charge against De G. in favour of manslaughter and rape charges. 

At another hearing in October 2015, De G. claimed to have never met the victim and denied contact with Van den Hurk at the time of her disappearance. Due to the hard evidence against this statement, the suspect and his defence team argued that Van den Hurk may have had consensual sex with De G. a few days before her murder and he was not able to remember the event due to his rough lifestyle at that moment.

Trial 
De G.'s trial began on 2 November 2015. Prosecution experts testified to the DNA evidence. Later in the month, the trial was suspended for two weeks during investigation into a witness's statement that De G. had confessed to killing a girl. In a later interview, the witness and another person said De G. had made this confession while the three were in a mental institution together a decade earlier. De G.'s attorney argued this testimony was motivated by the €15,000 reward.

A trace of semen containing DNA from at least two persons—believed by experts to be De G., Van den Hurk's then-boyfriend and possibly a third suspect—had been found on her remains.  With experts disagreeing on the reliability of the sample and the conclusions that could be drawn from the test results, it was announced in March 2016 that scientists would re-analyse the DNA results using new methods. 

On 19 April 2016, the court heard that it was 2.28 million times more likely than not that De G. was one of the people whose DNA was found on the remains.

Trial verdict 
On 12 October 2016, the prosecution demanded that De G. receive fourteen years' imprisonment, asserting that he could not have had consensual sex with Van den Hurk, arguing that she had no time for a second relationship.

On 21 November 2016, De G. was found guilty of rape but acquitted of manslaughter. The court sentenced the serial rapist to five years' imprisonment. In determining the penalty, the court took into account the finding that he was legally insane at the time of the crime. He was acquitted of manslaughter on the basis of the possibility of another suspect as the killer in this case, which could not be ruled out based on the test results of the complicated DNA mix.

Appeal and Supreme Court 
The public prosecution appealed against De G.'s acquittal shortly after the trial ended. The appeal case began on 28 August 2018. On 29 August, the prosecution demanded a sentence of fourteen years' imprisonment, as they had done in the initial trial. On 9 October, the acquittal was overturned and De G. was sentenced to twelve years' imprisonment for the rape and manslaughter of Van den Hurk. The sentence was upheld by the Supreme Court on 16 June 2020.

See also

Further reading 

 Official court document on the case (Dutch).

References

External links 

Timeline of Nicole van den Hurk murder case at Eindhovens Dagblad

1990s missing person cases
1995 crimes in the Netherlands
Events in Eindhoven
False confessions
October 1995 events in Europe
Rape in the Netherlands
Violence against women in the Netherlands